The 2019 Global Awards ceremony was held on Thursday 7 March 2019 at London's Eventim Apollo and was sponsored by very.co.uk.

Roman Kemp, Rochelle Humes and Myleene Klass returned to host for the second year.

Performances and special appearances included Little Mix, Lang Lang, Blossoms, Anne-Marie, Mark Ronson and Mabel.

Performances

Nominees and winners 
The list of nominees was announced in December 2018. Winners are listed first, in bold.

Multiple awards and nominations
 Artists with the most nominations

Four:
Little Mix

Three:
Jess Glynne
Dua Lipa
5 Seconds of Summer
Halsey

 Artists that received multiple awards
Two:
 Dua Lipa
 Mark Ronson
 Little Mix

References 

2019 music awards
2019 in British music
2019 awards in the United Kingdom